can take place within one municipality or between multiple municipalities and are required to be based upon consensus.

History 
There have been waves of merger activity between Japanese municipalities. Before the mergers, existing municipalities were the direct successors of spontaneous hamlets called , or villages under the han system. The rump han system is still reflected in the postal system for rural areas as postal units called . The mergers slashed ‘natural settlements’ (shizen sh¯uraku) that existed at the time from 71,314 to 15,859 cities, towns and villages, justified at the time by the increased scale and relevance of the resulting respective autonomous governing bodies.

The second peak, called , took place over the period from 1953 to 1956. It reduced the number of cities, towns and villages by over half, from 9,868 to 3,472 with purposes of the establishment of a National Treasury Subsidy System. 5,000 villages were disappeared, but the number of cities were doubled.

In 1965, the Special Law for Municipal Mergers (SLMM) enacted but it failed to motivate municipalities to voluntarily merge with others.

Causes
Declining birthrate of Japan and very bad fiscal led the Japanese central government to promote national consolidation reform.

As of January 2006, many municipalities in Japan contained fewer than 200 residents. Japanese municipalities require skilled workers. 40% of Japan's GDP consisted of debts from local governments. Japan merges local governments to expand residential area per municipal government, create different school attendance boundaries for elementary school and junior high school students, and to allow more widespread use of public facilities.

Merger
After the Decentralisation movement started, based on the Omnibus Decentralization Law and an amendment to the Special Law for Municipal Mergers (SLMM) in 1999, which provided strong financial and economic incentives for municipal consolidation, the central government forced municipal mergers by using incentive schemes according to special financial measures.

 Grace period to keep an original grant after municipal mergers, instead of combining two municipalities. If city A received 0, city B received 100, a combine would keep 100, guaranteeing the same amount of grants.
 After mergers, the issue of special local bonds would be paid through central government grants. There special bonds provided very strong incentive for the implementation of public works to support the new merged municipalities.

Although mergers were not mandatory, the central government established the goal to decrease municipality numbers to 1,000, and used incentives to urge prefectural governments to promote merger. There are two types of merger. Absorption by one city of others, the core city retains its name, legal status, mayor and legislative body, and municipal offices, while the absorbed entity loses theirs. The creation of a new entity out of the merger cities, when a new entity is created, they receive a new legal status, create a new name and location for government offices, and form a new council.

Local referendums
Local governments used local referendums or questionnaire surveys on merger to evaluate public opinion. There were 352 local referendums on merging took place from 1999 to 2006.

Great Heisei Amalgamations
Vast number of municipal amalgamations were executed from 1999 to 2010, so called Great Heisei Amalgamations. Municipality numbers dropped from 3,232 to 1,727.
Because the reduction of LATG from the Trinity Reform to smaller municipalities, they had to voluntary merge with others. Local governments with low financial
capabilities that cannot bear an unstable fiscal was the main motivation.

From April 1999 to April 2014, there were 188 cases of municipal absorption, and 461 new municipalities. Among them, 582 consolidations were done during the Great Heisei Consolidations period from April 1999 to March 2006. This number includes duplicated consolidations.

Amalgamate patterns
There are 8 merging patterns during the Great Heisei Amalgamations.
 Merge established by the Merger Council with original members.
 Merge after creating a new Merger Council with new partners.
 Merge in another Merger Council after seceding from the original Merger Council.
 A merger in which the original Merger Council increased in size with new members
 Continue as independent municipality after seceding from original Merger Council.
 Continue as an independent municipality having not joined a Merger Council.
 Continue as an independent municipality after the Merger Council dissolves.
 Merge on the basis of the Merger Law alone (without a Merger Council).

Record of changes 
List of mergers and dissolutions of municipalities in Japan shows mergers and dissolutions of municipalities that took place in recent years.

Naming of new municipalities 
Naming a new post-merger municipality is not a negligible matter. Disagreement on a name sometimes causes merger talks to break down. If a city is far larger than other towns which join it, no arguments take place; the city's name simply survives. However, if their sizes do not differ significantly, lengthy disputes ensue. Sometimes the problem can be solved by adopting the district's name. Another easy solution is a simple compounding of the names, but this method, relatively common in Europe, is unusual in Japan. Instead, they are often abbreviated. For example, the Ōta (大田) ward of Tokyo is a portmanteau of Ōmori (大森) and Kamata (蒲田), it seems that Ōkama was not chosen because of its likeness to 'okama', a derogatory word for homosexual. Toyoshina, Nagano, is an acronym of the four antecedent villages: Toba, Yoshino, Shinden, and Nariai.

Another common method is borrowing a well known nearby place name and adding a direction, like Nishitōkyō ("West Tokyo"), Kitakyūshū ("North Kyūshū"), Higashiōsaka ("East Osaka"), Shikokuchūō ("Central Shikoku") and recently Higashiōmi ("East Ōmi").

A characteristic of the Heisei mergers is a rapid increase of hiragana names. The names of Japan's cities used to be written in Kanji exclusively. Their number reached 45 by April 2006. The creation of Minami Alps in 2003 is the first example of a katakana city name.

Criticisms 

Most of Japan's rural municipalities largely depend on subsidies from the central government. They are often criticized for spending money for wasteful public enterprises to keep jobs. The central government, which is itself running budget deficits, has a policy of encouraging mergers to make the municipal system more efficient.

Although the government purports to respect self-determination of the municipalities, some consider the policy to be compulsory. As a result of mergers, some cities such as Daisen, Akita temporarily have very large city assemblies.

Some people see it as a form of federalism; they consider that the ultimate goal is to change Japan into a union consisting of more autonomous states. So far the mergers are limited to the local municipalities. Mergers of prefectures are also planned in some regions of Japan.

Suzuki and Ha's empirical research found that municipal merger in Japan during 2008 to 2014 discourages performance of legislative activity and bylaw proposals, using a dataset of 754 Japanese city-level governments. Local councils, after municipal merger, propose fewer municipal bylaws. Those mergers that created new communities appear to experience more worse performance. It also shows that enlarging municipal size is also negatively associated with legislative performance. Suzuki and Ha suggest that policy makers should consider the potential negative impact on democracy on municipal merger.

Ikuta concluded that, while there are cases of successful mergers embrace the common characteristics of the region as a whole, there are as well many merged municipalities that struggled with the new shared regional image and identity. The Great Heisei Amalgamations also undertook by misunderstanding of regional brands, medium- and long-term regional competitiveness for achieving
the local identity. It needed to be handled with a framework of post-merger period.

Rausch suggests that post-merger policy needed a framework such as tourism policy. Rausch pointed out an example of Hirosaki City merger with Iwaki Town and Soma Village which the city tourism policy focused only on Hirosaki images.

See also

 Decentralisation in Japan

References

Bibliography

External links
 Merger consultation, Ministry of Internal Affairs and Communications (Japanese)

Japan
Local government in Japan
Subdivisions of Japan
Political history of Japan